The 2012–13 CONCACAF Champions League was the 5th edition of the CONCACAF Champions League under its current name, and overall the 48th edition of the premier football club competition organized by CONCACAF, the regional governing body of North America, Central America and the Caribbean. It remained a 24-team tournament, but the format changed for this edition. CCL play began on July 31, 2012 and finished on May 1, 2013. The winner qualified as the CONCACAF representative for the 2013 FIFA Club World Cup.

Monterrey won their third consecutive title after defeating Santos Laguna in an all-Mexican final, and equaled Cruz Azul's feat of winning three consecutive CONCACAF club titles (1969–71), when the competition was known as the CONCACAF Champions' Cup.

Qualification

Twenty-four teams participate in the 2012–13 CONCACAF Champions League from the North American, Central American, and Caribbean zones. Nine of the teams come from North America, twelve from Central America, and three from the Caribbean.

Teams may be disqualified and replaced by a team from a different country if the club does not have an available stadium that meets CONCACAF regulations for safety. If a club's own stadium fails to meet the set standards then it may find a suitable replacement stadium within its own country. However, if it is still determined that the club cannot provide the adequate facilities then it runs the risk of being replaced.

North America
A total of nine clubs from the North American Football Union participate in the Champions League. Mexico and the United States are allocated four spots, the most of any CONCACAF nation, while Canada is granted one spot in the tournament.

In Mexico, the winners of the Mexican Primera División Apertura and Clausura tournaments earn berths in Pot A of the tournament's group stage, while the Apertura and Clausura runners-up earn berths in Pot B.

For the United States, three of its four spots are allocated through the Major League Soccer (MLS) regular season and playoffs, while the fourth spot is allocated to whoever wins the domestic cup competition, the Lamar Hunt U.S. Open Cup. The winner of the Supporters' Shield and MLS Cup (if US-based) are placed in Pot A; the MLS Cup runner-up (if US-based) and the U.S. Open Cup winner are placed in Pot B.

The winner of Canada's domestic cup competition, the Canadian Championship, earns the lone Canadian berth into the tournament, in Pot B. Despite the inclusion of Canadian teams in MLS, they cannot qualify for the CONCACAF Champions League through MLS, and if a Canadian-based MLS team win the Supporters' Shield or play in the MLS Cup final, the Champions League place is allocated to the US-based team with the best MLS regular season record who has failed to otherwise qualify.

Central America
Twelve clubs from the Central American Football Union qualify to the Champions League. If one or more clubs is precluded, it is supplanted by a club from another Central American federation. The reallocation would be based on results from previous Champions League tournaments.

For the Central American representatives that qualify via split seasons, in nations that play a playoff to determine a national champion, the winner gains the nation's top spot. In nations that don't utilize such methods, total points over both seasons, followed by other tiebreakers, determine which team gains the nation's top spot. The pots of the teams are as follows:
The top teams from the leagues of Costa Rica, Honduras, Guatemala and Panama are placed in Pot A.
The top team from the league of El Salvador, and the second teams from the leagues of Costa Rica and Honduras are placed in Pot B.
The second teams from the leagues of Guatemala, Panama and El Salvador, and the sole representatives from the leagues of Nicaragua and Belize are placed in Pot C.

Caribbean
Three berths in Pot C are allocated to the top three finishers of the CFU Club Championship, a subcontinental tournament for clubs from nations of the Caribbean Football Union. In order for a Caribbean club to qualify for the CFU Club Championship, they would need to finish as the champion (or in some cases, runner-up) in their respective nation's top league in the previous season.

If any Caribbean club is precluded, it is supplanted by the fourth-place finisher from the CFU Club Championship.

Teams
The following teams qualified for the tournament.

Notes
* Number of appearances, last appearance, and previous best result count only those in the CONCACAF Champions League era starting from 2008–09 (not counting those in the era of the Champions' Cup from 1962 to 2008).
† Because Belize does not have a stadium which meets CONCACAF'S minimum standards for the Champions League, the spot normally reserved for the champions of Belize was reallocated to El Salvador, since it was the only Central American nation to send a team to the 2011–12 CONCACAF Champions League quarterfinals.
Mexico (MEX): Because Santos Laguna, the 2011 Apertura runners-up, also won the 2012 Clausura, they relinquished the spot allocated to the Apertura runners-up to Guadalajara, the team with the best regular season record in the Apertura, based on the formula outlined by the Mexican Football Federation.
United States (USA): Because the Los Angeles Galaxy won both the 2011 MLS Supporters' Shield and the 2011 MLS Cup, Seattle Sounders FC, the 2011 MLS Supporters' Shield runners-up, was also placed in Pot A, and as they also won the 2011 U.S. Open Cup, a CCL berth became available and went to Real Salt Lake, the 2011 MLS Supporters' Shield third place.

Format
On January 12, 2012, CONCACAF announced that the 2012–13 tournament would be played under a different format than previous editions, where the preliminary round is eliminated and all qualified teams enter the group stage. In the group stage, the 24 teams are drawn into eight groups of three, with each group containing one team from each of the three pots. The allocation of teams into pots are based on their national association and qualifying berth. Teams from the same association (excluding "wildcard" teams which replace a team from another association) cannot be drawn with each other in the group stage, and each group is guaranteed to contain a team from either the United States or Mexico, meaning U.S. and Mexican teams cannot play each other in the group stage. Each group is played on a home-and-away round-robin basis. The winners of each group advance to the championship stage.

In the championship stage, the eight teams play a single-elimination tournament. Each tie is played on a home-and-away two-legged basis. The away goals rule is used if the aggregate score is level after normal time of the second leg, but not after extra time, and so a tie is decided by penalty shoot-out if the aggregate score is level after extra time of the second leg. Unlike previous years where a second draw was conducted to set the pairings for the championship stage, the bracket is determined by the teams' record in the group stage. The quarterfinals match the team with the best record against the team with the worst record, while the second-best team faces the seventh-best, third against sixth and fourth against fifth. The top four teams play the second leg at home. In the semifinals, the winner of 1-vs-8 faces the winner of 4-vs-5, with the 1-vs-8 winner hosting the second leg, and likewise 2-vs-7 plays 3-vs-6, with the 2-vs-7 winner hosting the second leg. In the finals, the team that prevails out of the upper bracket of 1-8-4-5 hosts the second leg. This means that the higher-seeded team does not necessarily host the second leg in the semifinals and finals.

Schedule
The schedule of the competition was as follows.

Group stage

The draw for the group stage was held on June 5, 2012. The winners of each group advanced to the championship stage.

Tiebreakers
The teams are ranked according to points (3 points for a win, 1 point for a tie, 0 points for a loss). If tied on points, tiebreakers are applied in the following order:
Greater number of points earned in matches between the teams concerned
Greater goal difference in matches between the teams concerned
Greater number of goals scored away from home in matches between the teams concerned
Reapply first three criteria if two or more teams are still tied
Greater goal difference in all group matches
Greater number of goals scored in group matches
Greater number of goals scored away in all group matches
Drawing of lots

Group 1

Group 2

Group 3

Group 4

Group 5

Group 6

Group 7

Group 8

Championship stage

Seeding

Bracket
The bracket of the championship stage was determined by the seeding as follows:
Quarterfinals: Seed 1 vs. Seed 8 (QF1), Seed 2 vs. Seed 7 (QF2), Seed 3 vs. Seed 6 (QF3), Seed 4 vs. Seed 5 (QF4), with seeds 1–4 hosting the second leg
Semifinals: Winner QF1 vs. Winner QF4 (SF1), Winner QF2 vs. Winner QF3 (SF2), with winners QF1 and QF2 hosting the second leg
Finals: Winner SF1 vs. Winner SF2, with winner SF1 hosting the second leg

Quarterfinals

|}

Semifinals

|}

Final

Awards

Top goalscorers

See also
2013 FIFA Club World Cup

References

External links

 
1
CONCACAF Champions League seasons